Terra Firma is an album by Australian guitarist Tommy Emmanuel with his brother Phil that was released in February 1995 and peaked at No. 12 on the ARIA Albums Chart in Australia. The song "(Back on the) Terra Firma" reached No. 45 on the ARIA Singles Chart.

At the ARIA Music Awards of 1995, the album was nominated for the ARIA Award for Best Adult Contemporary Album but lost to Brood by My Friend the Chocolate Cake.

Track listing

Personnel
Tommy Emmanuel – guitar
Phil Emmanuel – guitar
Joe Chindamo – accordion
Broderick Smith – harmonica
Rob Little – bass guitar
Kevin Murphy – drums

Charts

References

1995 albums
Tommy Emmanuel albums
Collaborative albums
Columbia Records albums